Alexander Vasilyevich Suvorov (or 1730) was a Russian general in service of the Russian Empire. He was Count of Rymnik, Count of the Holy Roman Empire, Prince of the Kingdom of Sardinia, Prince of the Russian Empire and the last Generalissimo of the Russian Empire. Suvorov is considered one of the greatest military commanders in Russian history and one of the great generals of the early modern period. He was awarded numerous medals, titles, and honors by Russia, as well as by other countries. Suvorov secured Russia's expanded borders and renewed military prestige and left a legacy of theories on warfare. He was the author of several military manuals, the most famous being The Science of Victory, and was noted for several of his sayings. He never lost a single battle he commanded. Several military academies, monuments, villages, museums, and orders in Russia are dedicated to him.

Born in Moscow, he studied military history as a young boy and joined the Imperial Russian Army at the age of 17. During the Seven Years' War he was promoted to colonel in 1762 for his success on the battlefield. When war broke out with the Bar Confederation in 1768, Suvorov captured Kraków and defeated the Poles at Lanckorona and Stołowicze, bringing about the start of the Partitions of Poland. He was promoted to general and next fought in the Russo-Turkish War of 1768–1774, winning a decisive victory at the Battle of Kozludzha. Becoming the General of the Infantry in 1786, he commanded in the Russo-Turkish War of 1787–1792 and won crushing victories at the Battle of Rymnik and Siege of Izmail. 

For his accomplishments, he was made a Count of both the Russian Empire and Holy Roman Empire. Suvorov put down a Polish uprising in 1794, defeating them at the Battle of Maciejowice and storming Warsaw.

While a close associate of Empress Catherine the Great, Suvorov often quarreled with her son and heir apparent, Paul. After Catherine died of a stroke in 1796, Paul I was crowned Emperor and dismissed Suvorov for disregarding his orders. However, he was forced to reinstate Suvorov and make him a field marshal at the insistence of the coalition allies for the French Revolutionary Wars. 

Suvorov was given command of the Austro-Russian army, captured Milan, and drove the French out of Italy through his triumphs at Cassano d'Adda, Trebbia, and Novi. Suvorov was made a Prince of Italy for his deeds. Afterwards, he was ordered to head to Switzerland to assist allied operations. He was cut off by André Masséna and later became surrounded in the Swiss Alps by the French after an allied Russo-Austrian army he was supposed to reinforce suffered defeat at Zurich. Suvorov led the strategic withdrawal of Russian troops dealing with French forces four times the size of his own and returned to Russia with minimal casualties. For this exploit, he became the fourth Generalissimo of Russia. He died in 1800 of illness in Saint Petersburg.

Early life and career
Alexander Suvorov was born into a noble family originating from Novgorod at the Moscow mansion of his maternal grandfather, Fedosey Manukov. His father, Vasiliy Suvorov, was a general-in-chief and a senator in the Governing Senate, and was credited with translating Vauban's works into Russian. His mother, Avdotya Fyodorovna (née Manukova), was the daughter of Fedosey Manukov. According to a family legend his paternal ancestor named Suvor had emigrated from Karelia, Sweden with his family in 1622 and enlisted at the Russian service to serve Tsar Mikhail Feodorovich (his descendants became Suvorovs). Suvorov himself narrated for the record the historical account of his family to his aide, colonel Anthing, telling particularly that his Swedish-born ancestor was of noble descent, having engaged under the Russian banner in the wars against the Tatars and Poles. These exploits were rewarded by Tsars with lands and peasants. Baskakov also pointed to the fact that the Suvorovs' family coat of arms lacks any Swedish symbols, implying its Russian origins. Among the first of those who pointed to the Russian origin of the name were Empress Catherine II, who noted in a letter to Johann von Zimmerman in 1790: "It is beyond doubt that the name of the Suvorovs has long been noble, is Russian from time immemorial and resides in Russia", and Count Semyon Vorontsov in 1811, a person familiar with the Suvorovs. Their views were supported by later historians: it was estimated that by 1699 there were at least 19 Russian landlord families of the same name in Russia, not counting their namesakes of lower status, and they all could not descend from a single foreigner who arrived only in 1622. Moreover, genealogy studies indicated a Russian landowner named Suvor mentioned under the year 1498, whereas documents of the 16th century mention Vasily and Savely Suvorovs, with the last of them being a proven ancestor of General Alexander Suvorov. The Swedish version of Suvorov's genealogy had been debunked in the Genealogical book of Russian nobility by V. Rummel and V. Golubtsov (1887) tracing Suvorov's ancestors from the 17th-century Tver gentry. In 1756 Alexander Suvorov's first cousin, Sergey Ivanovich Suvorov, in his statement of background (skazka) for his son said that he did not have any proof of nobility; he started his genealogy from his great-grandfather, Grigory Ivanovich Suvorov, who 'served as a dvorovoy boyar scion at Kashin.

As a boy, Suvorov was a sickly child and his father assumed he would work in civil service as an adult. However, he proved to be an excellent learner, avidly studying mathematics, literature, philosophy, and geography, learning to read French, German, Polish, and Italian, and with his father's vast library devoted himself to intense study of military history, strategy, tactics, and several military authors including Plutarch, Quintus Curtius, Cornelius Nepos, Julius Caesar, and Charles XII. This also helped him develop a good understanding of engineering, siege warfare, artillery, and fortification. He tried to overcome his physical ailments through rigorous exercise and exposure to hardship. His father, however, insisted that he was not fit for the military. When Alexander was 12, General Gannibal, who lived in the neighborhood, overheard his father complaining about Alexander and asked to speak to the child. Gannibal was so impressed with the boy that he persuaded the father to allow him to pursue the career of his choice.
Suvorov entered the army in 1748 and served in the Semyonovsky Life Guard Regiment for six years. During this period he continued his studies attending classes at Cadet Corps of Land Forces. He gained his first battle experience fighting against the Prussians during the Seven Years' War (1756–1763). After repeatedly distinguishing himself in battle Suvorov became a colonel in 1762, aged around 33.
Suvorov next served in Poland during the Confederation of Bar, dispersed the Polish forces under Pułaski, and captured Kraków (1768), paving the way for the first partition of Poland between Austria, Prussia and Russia, and reached the rank of major-general.

The Russo-Turkish War of 1768–1774 saw his first successful campaigns against the Turks in 1773–1774, and particularly in the Battle of Kozluca, he laid the foundations of his reputation, becoming a lieutenant-general in 1774. His later earned victories against the Ottomans bolstered the morale of his soldiers who were usually outnumbered. His astuteness in war was uncanny and he also proved a self-willed subordinate who acted upon his own initiative. For "unauthorized actions against the Turks," Suvorov was tried and sentenced to death but Tsarina Catherine the Great refused to uphold the verdict, proclaiming "winners can't be judged."

In 1774, Suvorov was dispatched to suppress Pugachev's Rebellion, whose leader claimed to be the assassinated Tsar Peter III. Suvorov arrived at the scene only in time to conduct the first interrogation of the rebel leader, who had been betrayed by his fellow Cossacks and was eventually beheaded in Moscow. The next year, he married into the influential Golitsyn family.

Battles against the Ottoman Empire

From 1774 to 1786, Suvorov served in the Kuban, the Crimea, the Caucasus, Finland, and Russia itself. He became General of the Infantry in 1786, upon completion of his tour of duty in the Caucasus. In 1778, he prevented a Turkish landing in the Crimea, thwarting another Russo-Turkish war. He commanded the Russian troops in the Crimea from 1782 to 1784. In 1783 he suppressed the Kuban Nogai Uprising. On behalf of Empress Catherine II, he organized the resettlement of Armenian migrants displaced from Crimea and gave them permission to establish a new city, named Nor Nakhichevan by the Armenians.

From 1787 to 1791 he again fought the Turks during the Russo-Turkish War of 1787–1792 and won many victories; he was wounded twice at Kinburn (1787), took part in the siege of Ochakov, and in 1789 won two great victories at Focșani and by the river Rymnik, where a Russo-Austrian force of 25,000 routed 100,000 Turks within a few hours, losing only 500 men in the process. In both these battles an Austrian corps under Prince Josias of Saxe-Coburg participated, but at the battle of Rymnik, Suvorov was in command of the whole allied forces. For the latter victory, Catherine the Great made Suvorov a count with the name "Rymniksky" in addition to his own name, and the Emperor Joseph II made him a count of the Holy Roman Empire.

Suvorov led the Siege of Izmail in Bessarabia on 22 December 1790. His capture of the reputedly unconquerable fortress played a vital role in Russia's victory in the war. Turkish forces inside the fortress had the orders to stand their ground to the end and haughtily declined the Russian ultimatum. Their defeat was seen as a major catastrophe in the Ottoman empire. An unofficial Russian national anthem in the late 18th and early 19th centuries "Grom pobedy, razdavaysya!" (Let the thunder of victory sound!) commemorates Suvorov's victory and 24 December is today commemorated as a Day of Military Honour in Russia. Suvorov announced the capture of Ismail in 1791 to the Empress Catherine in a doggerel couplet.

Battles against Polish uprising

Immediately after signing the Treaty of Jassy with the Ottoman Empire, Suvorov was transferred to Poland where he assumed the command of one of the corps and took part in the Battle of Maciejowice. There, he captured the Polish commander-in-chief Tadeusz Kościuszko. On November 4, 1794, Suvorov's forces stormed Warsaw and captured Praga, one of its boroughs.

The massacre of approximately 20,000 civilians in Praga broke the spirits of the defenders and soon put an end to the Kościuszko Uprising. According to some sources the massacre was the deed of Cossacks who were semi-independent and were not directly subordinate to Suvorov. The Russian general supposedly tried to stop the massacre and even went to the extent of ordering the destruction of the bridge to Warsaw over the Vistula River with the purpose of preventing the spread of violence to Warsaw from its suburb. Other historians dispute this, but most sources make no reference to Suvorov either deliberately encouraging or attempting to prevent the massacre.

Suvorov sent a report to his sovereign consisting of only three words: "Hurrah, Warsaw's ours!" (Ура, Варшава наша!). Catherine replied in two words: "Hurrah, Field-Marshal!" (rus. Ура, фельдмаршал!—that is, awarding him this title). The newly appointed field marshal remained in Poland until 1795, when he returned to Saint Petersburg. But his sovereign and friend Catherine died in 1796, and her son and successor Paul I dismissed the veteran in disgrace.

Suvorov's Italian campaign

Suvorov remained a close confidant of Catherine, but he had a negative relationship with her son and heir apparent Paul. As a prince, Paul became fanatically interested in the flashy but dysfunctional uniforms, parades, drills, and common corporal punishments of the Prussian Army. He even had his own regiment of Russian soldiers whom he dressed up in Prussian-style uniforms and paraded around. Suvorov was strongly opposed to these uniforms and had fought hard for Catherine to get rid of similar uniforms that were used by Russians up until 1784.

When Catherine died of a stroke in 1796, Paul I was crowned Emperor and brought back these outdated uniforms. Suvorov was not happy with this and disregarded Paul's orders to train new soldiers in this Prussian manner, which he considered cruel and useless. Paul was infuriated and dismissed Suvorov, exiling him to his estate Konchanskoye near Borovichi and kept under surveillance. His correspondence with his wife, who had remained at Moscow for his marriage relations had not been happy, was also tampered with. It is recorded that on Sundays he tolled the bell for church and sang among the rustics in the village choir. On week days he worked among them in a smock-frock.

In February 1799, Paul I, worried about the victories of France in Europe during the French Revolutionary Wars and at the insistence of the coalition leaders, was forced to reinstate Suvorov as field marshal. Suvorov was given command of the Austro-Russian army and sent to drive France's forces out of Italy. Suvorov and Napoleon never met in battle because Napoleon was campaigning in Egypt at the time. However, Suvorov erased practically all of the gains Napoleon had made for France during 1796 and 1797, defeating some of the republic's top generals: Moreau at Cassano d'Adda, MacDonald at Trebbia, and Joubert at Novi. He went on to capture Milan and became a hero to those opposed to the French Revolution. French troops were driven from Italy, save for a handful in the Maritime Alps and around Genoa. Suvorov himself gained the rank of "Prince of the House of Savoy" from the King of Sardinia.

After the victorious Italian theater, Suvorov planned to march on Paris, but instead was ordered to Switzerland to join up with the Russian forces already there and drive the French out. The Russian army under General Korsakov was defeated by Masséna at Zürich before Suvorov could reach and unite with them. Surrounded by Masséna's 80,000 French troops, Suvorov with a force of 18,000 Russian regulars and 5,000 Cossacks, exhausted and short of provisions, led a strategic withdrawal from the Alps while fighting off the French. His host hoped to make its way over the Swiss passes to the Upper Rhine and arrive at Vorarlberg, where the army, much shattered and almost destitute of horses and artillery, went into winter quarters. When Suvorov battled his way through the snow-capped Alps his army was checked but never defeated. Suvorov refused to call it a retreat and commenced a trek through the deep snows of Panix Pass and into the 9,000-foot mountains of the Bündner Oberland, by then deep in snow. Thousands of Russians slipped from the cliffs or succumbed to cold and hunger, eventually escaping encirclement and reached Chur on the Rhine, with the bulk of his army intact at 16,000 men. For this marvel of strategic retreat, earning him the nickname of the Russian Hannibal, Suvorov became the fourth Generalissimo of Russia.

He was officially promised a military triumph in Russia, but Emperor Paul cancelled the ceremony and recalled the Russian armies from Europe. Early in 1800, Suvorov returned to Saint Petersburg. Paul refused to give him an audience, and, worn out and ill, the old veteran died a few days afterwards on 18 May 1800, at Saint Petersburg. Suvorov was meant to receive the funeral honors of a Generalissimo, but was buried as an ordinary field marshal due to Paul's direct interference. Lord Whitworth, the British ambassador, and the poet Gavrila Derzhavin were the only persons of distinction present at the funeral. Suvorov lies buried in the Church of the Annunciation in the Alexander Nevsky Monastery, the simple inscription on his grave stating, according to his own direction, "Here lies Suvorov."

Progeny and titles

Suvorov's full name and titles (according to Russian pronunciation), ranks and awards are the following: "Aleksandr Vasiliyevich Suvorov, Prince of Italy, Count of Rymnik, Count of the Holy Roman Empire, Prince of Sardinia, Generalissimo of Russia's Ground and Naval forces, Field Marshal of the Austrian and Sardinian armies". Seriously wounded six times, he was the recipient of the Order of St. Andrew, the Apostle First Called, Order of St. George the Bringer of Victory First Class, Order of St. Vladimir First Class, Order of St. Alexander Nevsky, Order of St. Anna First Class, Grand Cross of the Order of St. John of Jerusalem, (Austria) Order of Maria Theresa First Class, (Austria) Order of the Black Eagle, Order of the Red Eagle, the Pour le Mérite, (Prussia) Order of the Revered Saints Maurice and Lazarus, (Sardinia) Order of St. Gubert, the Golden Lioness, (France) United Orders of the Carmelite Virgin Mary and St. Lazarus (on 20. April 1800), (Poland) Order of the White Eagle, the Order of Saint Stanislaus.

Suvorov was married to Varvara Ivanovna Prozorovskaya of the Golitsyn family and had a son and daughter, but his family life was not happy and he had an unpleasant relationship with his wife due to her infidelity. Suvorov's son, Arkadi Suvorov (1783–1811) served as a general officer in the Russian army during the Napoleonic and Turkish wars of the early 19th century, and drowned in the same river Rymnik in 1811 that had brought his father so much fame. The drowning of his son in the river is supported by Aleksey Yermolov's memoirs, as well as by the military historian Christopher Duffy. His grandson Alexander Arkadievich (1804–1882) served as Governor General of Riga in 1848–61 and Saint Petersburg in 1861–66. Suvorov's daughter Natalia Alexandrovna (1775–1844) known under her name Suvorochka married Count Nikolay Zubov.

Assessment

Russians have long cherished the memory of Suvorov as a great general. While on a campaign, he reportedly lived as a private soldier, sleeping on straw and contenting himself with the humblest fare. Suvorov considered victory dependent on the morale, training, and initiative of the front-line soldier. In battle he emphasized speed and mobility, accuracy of gunfire and the use of the bayonet, as well as detailed planning and careful strategy. He abandoned traditional drills, and communicated with his troops in clear and understandable ways. Suvorov also took great care of his army's supplies and living conditions, reducing cases of illness among his soldiers dramatically, and earning their loyalty and affection.

He was seriously wounded six times in his military career. Suvorov's guiding principle was to detect the weakest point of an enemy and focus an attack upon that area. He would send forth his units in small groups as they arrived on the battlefield in order to sustain momentum. Suvorov utilized aimed fire instead of repeated barrages from line infantry and applied light infantrymen as skirmishers and sharpshooters. He used a variety of army sizes and types of formations against different foes: squares against the Turks, lines against Poles, and columns against the French.

According to D. S. Mirsky, Suvorov "gave much attention to the form of his correspondence, and especially of his orders of the day. These latter are highly original, deliberately aiming at unexpected and striking effects. Their style is a succession of nervous staccato sentences, which produce the effect of blow and flashes. Suvorov's official reports often assume a memorable and striking form. His writings are as different from the common run of classical prose as his tactics were from those of Frederick or Marlborough."

Mikhail Ivanovich Dragomirov (1830–1905) declared that he based his teaching on Suvorov's practice, which he held as representative of the fundamental truths of war and of the military qualities of the Russian nation.

Suvorov considered Hannibal, Alexander the Great, Julius Caesar, and Napoleon Bonaparte to be the greatest military commanders of all time. His high regard for Napoleon is interesting because he did not live to see the Napoleonic Wars. Suvorov is often compared to Napoleon, whom he was on opposing sides of during the late French Revolutionary Wars and desired to face in battle, but never did so because Napoleon was campaigning in Egypt while Suvorov was campaigning in Italy. Military historians often debate between Suvorov and Napoleon as to who was the superior commander.

His political views were centered around enlightened monarchy. However, Suvorov had no interest in pursuing politics and made his disdain for the court lifestyle and tendencies of aristocrats well known: he lacked diplomacy in his dispatches, and his sarcasm triggered enmity among some courtiers.

Legacy

Suvorov was buried in Saint Petersburg in the Alexander Nevsky Lavra. His gravestone states simply: "Here lies Suvorov". Within a year after his death, Paul I was murdered in his bedroom for his disastrous leadership by a band of dismissed officers and his son and successor Alexander I erected a statue to Suvorov's memory in the Field of Mars.

He was famed for his military writings, the most well-known being The Science of Victory and Suzdal Regulations, and lesser-known works such as Rules for the Kuban and Crimean Corps, Rules for the Conduct of Military Actions in the Mountains (written during his Swiss campaign), and Rules for the Medical Officers. Suvorov was also noted for several of his sayings, including "What is difficult in training will become easy in a battle," "The bullet is a mad thing; only the bayonet knows what it is about," and "Perish yourself but rescue your comrade!" He taught his soldiers to attack instantly and decisively: "Attack with the cold steel! Push hard with the bayonet!" He joked with the men, calling common soldiers "brother," and shrewdly presented the results of detailed planning and careful strategy as the work of inspiration.

A "Suvorov school" of generals who had apprenticed under him played a prominent role in the Russian military. Among them was future Field Marshal Mikhail Kutuzov who led the Imperial Russian Army against Napoleon during the Napoleonic Wars, including the French invasion of Russia.

The Suvorov Museum opened in Saint Petersburg in 1900 to commemorate the centenary of the general's death. Apart from in St. Petersburg, other Suvorov monuments have feature in Focșani, Ochakiv (1907), Sevastopol, Tulchin, Kobrin, Novaya Ladoga, Kherson, Timanovka, Simferopol, Kaliningrad, Konchanskoye, Rymnik, Elm, Switzerland and in the Swiss Alps.

During World War II, the Soviet Union revived the memory of many pre-1917 heroes in order to raise patriotism. Suvorov was the Tsarist military figure most often referred to by Joseph Stalin, who also received (but did not personally use) the rank of Generalissimo that Suvorov had previously held. The Order of Suvorov was established by the Presidium of the Supreme Soviet on 29 July 1942 and is awarded to senior army personnel for exceptional leadership in combat operations against superior enemy forces.

The town of Suvorovo in Varna Province, Bulgaria, was named after Suvorov, as was the Russian ship which discovered Suwarrow Island in the Pacific in 1814.

Various currency notes of the Transnistrian ruble depict Suvorov.

There is a Square in Tiraspol, Transnistria named after Suvorov, and another in Saint Petersburg.

His prowess, military wisdom, and daring remain in high regard. Another of his many utterances, "Achieve victory not by numbers, but by knowing how" and "Train hard, fight easy. Train easy and you will have hard fighting" are well known in the Russian military. "Train hard, fight easy" became a Russian proverb.

A bust of the Generalissimo is prominently displayed in the office of the Russian Minister of Defense.

In Russia, there are 12 secondary-level military schools called Suvorov Military School that were established during the USSR. There is also a military school in Minsk named after Suvorov.

Russia's defence minister Sergei Shoigu has proposed that  Suvorov be made a saint in the Russian Orthodox Church.

Ukraine 
Due to "decommunization policies" the street named after Suvorov in (Ukraine's capital) Kyiv was renamed after Mykhailo Omelianovych-Pavlenko in 2016.

In September 2022 a street that was named after Suvorov in Dnipro (Ukraine) was renamed to honor Alan Shepard.

In October 2022, during the Russian invasion of Ukraine, Russian troops captured a monument to Suvorov in Kherson and took it with them as they fled the city.
	
In December 2022 another street in Kyiv that was still named after Suvorov was renamed to Serhiy Kotenko Street.

In January 2023 an image of Suvorov on a monument was removed in Odesa.

Literary references
Poet Alexander Shishkov devoted an epitaph to Suvorov, while Gavrila Derzhavin mentioned him in Snigir (Bullfinch) and other poems, calling Suvorov "an Alexander by military prowess, a stoic by valor". Suvorov was mentioned by Alexander Pushkin and Mikhail Lermontov and in the numerous works of other Russian poets of the 18th and 19th centuries, such as Ivan Dmitriev, Apollon Maykov, Dmitry Khvostov, Kondraty Ryleyev, Vasili Popugaev. In 1795 poet and soldier , who had fought under the command of Alexander Suvorov, wrote a heroic poem titled "Suvoriada", celebrating Suvorov's victories. Suvorov is one of the characters in the drama "Antonio Gamba, Companion of Suvorov in the Alpine Mountains" by Sergey Glinka which commemorates the Swiss expedition of 1799. In British literature, Byron caricatured Suvorov in the seventh canto of Don Juan. In Leo Tolstoy's War and Peace, old Prince Nicholas Bolkonski says: "Suvorov couldn't manage them so what chance has Michael Kutuzov?" Tolstoy also refers to Suvorov later on in the book. Suvorov is also mentioned by Capt. Ryków in Adam Mickiewicz's poem Pan Tadeusz.

See also
 Suvorov Military School
 Suvorov military canals
 Suvorov Museum
 Order of Suvorov
 Medal of Suvorov
 Aleksandr Suvorov (ship)
 Russian battleship Knyaz Suvorov

References

Attribution:

Further reading
 Longworth, Philip. 1965. The Art of Victory. New York: Holt, Rinehart, and Winston
 J.F. Anthing, Versuch einer Kriegsgeschichte des Grafen Suworow (Gotha, 1796–1799)
 Clausewitz, Carl von (2020). Napoleon Absent, Coalition Ascendant: The 1799 Campaign in Italy and Switzerland, Volume 1. Trans and ed. Nicholas Murray and Christopher Pringle. Lawrence, Kansas: University Press of Kansas. 
 Clausewitz, Carl von (2021). The Coalition Crumbles, Napoleon Returns: The 1799 Campaign in Italy and Switzerland, Volume 2. Trans and ed. Nicholas Murray and Christopher Pringle. Lawrence, Kansas: University Press of Kansas. 
 
 G. von Fuchs, Suworows Korrespondenz, 1799 (Glogau, 1835)
 Von Reding-Biberegg, Der Zug Suworows durch die Schweiz (Zürich 1896)
 F. von Smut, Suworows Leben und Heerzüge (Vilna, 1833–1834) and Suworow and Polens Untergang (Leipzig, 1858,)
 Lieut.-Colonel Spalding, Suvorof (London, 1890)
 Souvorov en Italie by Gachot, Masséna's biographer (Paris, 1903)
 The standard Russian biographies of Polevoi (1853; Ger. trans., Mitau, 1853); Rybkin (Moscow, 1874), Vasiliev (Vilna, 1899), Meshcheryakov and Beskrovnyi (Moscow, 1946), and Osipov (Moscow, 1955).
 The Russian examinations of his martial art, by Bogolyubov (Moscow, 1939) and Nikolsky (Moscow, 1949).
 "1799 le baionette sagge" by Marco Galandra and Marco Baratto (Pavia, 1999).
 "SUVOROV – La Campagna Italo-Svizzera e la liberazione di Torino nel 1799" by Maria Fedotova ed. Pintore (Torino, 2004).

External links

 Alexander V. Suvorov: Russian Field Marshal, 1729–1800
 Speed, Assessment, and Hitting Power: Suvorov's Art of Victory
 Suvorov military museum in Saint Petersburg
 Suvorov's home and family
 Suvorov – the one man who could have stopped Bonaparte
 Aleksandr Suvorov: Count of Rymniksky and Prince of Italy
 Alexander Suvorov: The Science of Victory (Untranslated)

 
1730 births
1800 deaths
Writers from Moscow
People from Moscow Governorate
Field marshals of Russia
Military leaders of the French Revolutionary Wars
Russian military personnel of the French Revolutionary Wars
Russian commanders of the Napoleonic Wars
Military writers from the Russian Empire
Field marshals of Austria
Russian people of the Kościuszko Uprising
Russian people of the Bar Confederation
Recipients of the Pour le Mérite (military class)
Counts of the Russian Empire
Counts of the Holy Roman Empire
Knights of Malta
Recipients of the Order of St. George of the First Degree
Recipients of the Order of St. George of the Second Degree
Recipients of the Order of St. George of the Third Degree
Knights Grand Cross of the Order of Saints Maurice and Lazarus
Grand Crosses of the Military Order of Maria Theresa
Alexander
Generalissimos
People of the Russo-Turkish War (1768–1774)
18th-century military personnel from the Russian Empire
Burials at the Annunciation Church of the Alexander Nevsky Lavra
Recipients of the Order of the White Eagle (Poland)
Russian princes
Italian princes
Pugachev's Rebellion